The Gimpel is a peak in the Tannheim Mountains, a sub-range of the Allgäu Alps. It is 2,173 m high.
The name is derived from the Gimpelalpe alp in der "hollow" (Mulde) (Celtic comba = English "coombe"). The Gimpel is made of Wetterstein limestone.

Location 
The arête of the Judenscharte links the Gimpel with the Rote Flüh; the Schäfer (2,060 m), also called the "Little Gimpel" (kleiner Gimpel) with the  Kellenspitze.

Alpinism 
There are several climbing tours on the Gimpel, ranging from  alpine, classic routes like the West Arête (first climbed by J. Bachschmid and E. Christa in 1896, UIAA grade III+) to the top-sport climb of Primavera (first ascended by Baldo Pazzaglia in 1992, UIAA grade IX−).

Even the normal route up the South Face and the East Arête is only possible by negotiating grade II sections.

In 1990 Toni Freudig discovered a cave system in the South Face (the Gimpel Labyrinth).

In 1999 the Gimpel was one of the first mountains in the Allgäu, whose most popular routes were fitted with climbing bolts after a three people in a roped team from Oy/Mittelberg were killed on the neighbouring Rote Flüh when the rope broke causing the team to fall.

Huts 
 Tannheimer Hut (DAV) from  Nesselwängle
 Gimpelhaus (private) from Nesselwängle
 Otto Mayr Hut (DAV) or Füssener Hut (private) from Musau
 Schneetalalm (municipality of Weißenbach) from Höfen
 Gimpelalm (municipality of Nesselwängle) – mountain rescue base

References

Literature 
 Toni Freudig: Klettern auf der Tannheimer Sonnenseite. Pfronten. 1999, .
 Achim Pasold: Kletterführer Allgäu. 6th edition, Panico Verlag, Köngen, 2010, .
 Thomas Otto: Münchner Bergtouren. 1st edition, Bergverlag Rother, Munich, 2012, .

External links 

 Tourreport of the Schertelplatte
 The Gimpel at myMountains.de with route information

Two-thousanders of Austria
Mountains of Tyrol (state)
Mountains of the Alps
Allgäu Alps